The Sierra de Tejeda is a mountain range in the Penibaetic System of mountains between the provinces of Málaga and Granada in Spain.
Together with the Sierra de Almijara to the east and the Sierra de Alhama to the west it constitutes a limestone massif that acts as a physical border between the two provinces, separating the Axarquía from the depression of Granada. 
The mountains contain the Sierras of Tejeda, Almijara and Alhama Natural Park.

Location

The Sierra de Tejeda is a small mountain range running in a northwest to southeast direction.
It lies in the east of the  Málaga and the southwest of the Granada.
The Sierre de Tejeda lies to the southeast of the Sierra de Alhama and to the northwest of the Sierra de Almijara.
The mountains form part of a barrier between the coast and the interior.

The name "Tejeda'''" refers to the abundance of  Taxus baccata, or tejos'' (yew) trees in the past..
There are a few remnants of these pines on La Maroma, including one at the Salto del Caballo near the peak.
A small group is found in the upper part of the Barranco del Cañuelo in the municipality of Alcaucín.

Geology

The Sierra de Tejeda is in the central section of the Betic Range of Southern Spain.
This part of the Betic cordilla has folds verging southwards from the Burdigalian age.
The folds are cut by WSW-directed faults caused by extensional detachments in the Sierra de Tejeda anticline, and the fault surfaces are in turn cut by later NNW-directed faults from the Tortonian age.

The most common rock in the Sierra Tejeda is limestone.
The rocks belong to the Alpujarride complex.
The Sierra Almijara and Sierra Tejeda form the southern margin of the western part of the depression of Granada, and contain tributaries of the Cacín River.
Pliocene sediments exposed in the northwest of the Granada basin were washed down by the Cacín from the Alpujarride reliefs of the Almijara/Tejeda.

The 1884 Andalusian earthquake had an estimated magnitude of 6.5.
There were 745 deaths, and the villages of Arenas del Rey, Ventas de Zafarraya and Alhama de Granada were almost completely destroyed.
The pioneering geologist José Macpherson y Hemas (1839–1902) explained the earthquake as having been caused by movement along the faults that bound the Tejeda / Almijara massif to the north and south.
Others thought the cause might have been the collapse of underground cavities.

Pico Tejeda

The Pico Tejeda, commonly called La Maroma, is also known as the "roof of Málaga".
The name is derived from a large and deep cavity near the top. 
Ropes (maromas) were used to climb down into it to collect snow.
The mountain can be climbed by several routes, of which the most traditional starts from the center of Canillas de Aceituno.
Other routes start from the Alcázar recreational area and from the Llanadas de Sedella in the municipality of Alcaucín.
One of the simplest routes is on its north face in the territory of Alhama de Granada, starting from the El Robledal recreational area.

Climate

The mountains have relatively high levels of rainfall, with highest rainfall in December, January and March, and lowest in July.

The flora are mostly xeric.
There are many plant species common to the western Sierra Nevada and the Tejeda/Almijara range, which may have migrated between these regions via the intermediate Sierra de las Guájaras.

Human presence

The early hominids in the region would have moved from caves on the coast to caves in the Sierra de Tejeda on a seasonal basis.
The 40,000 year old bones of a Neanderthal man have been found in the Boquete de Zafarraya cave in Alcaucín, in a spur of the Sierra de Alhama just west of the Sierra de Tejeda.
The Fajara cave was used in the Neolithic era, and the Rábita cave shows evidence of iron ore extraction in Roman times.
Three bridges on the slopes of the sierra in the towns of Sedella, Salares and Canillas de Albaida are said to have a Roman origin, although their appearance today is medieval.

Notes

Sources

Alhama
Tejeda
Geography of the Province of Granada
Geography of the Province of Málaga